The list of ship launches in 1843 includes a chronological list of some ships launched in 1843.



|-----

References

1843
Ship launches